V810 Centauri is a double star consisting of a yellow hypergiant primary (V810 Cen A) and blue giant secondary (V810 Cen B).  It is a small amplitude variable star, entirely due to the supergiant primary which is visually over three magnitudes (about 12x) brighter than the secondary.  It is the MK spectral standard for class G0 0-Ia.

V810 Cen A shows semi-regular variations with several component periods.  The dominant mode is around 156 days and corresponds to Cepheid fundamental mode radial pulsation. Without the other stellar pulsation modes it would be considered a Classical Cepheid variable. Other pulsation modes have been detected at 89 to 234 days, with the strongest being a possible non-radial p-mode at 107 days and a possible non-radial g-mode at 185 days.

The blue giant secondary has a similar mass and luminosity to the supergiant primary, but is visually much fainter.  The primary is expected to have lost around  since it was on the main sequence, and has expanded and cooled so it lies at the blue edge of the Cepheid instability strip.  It is expected to get no cooler and may perform a blue loop while slowly increasing in luminosity.

V810 Cen was once thought to be a member of the Stock 14 open cluster at 2.6 kpc, but now appears to be more distant.  The distance derived from spectrophotometric study is larger than the mean Hipparcos parallax value but within the margin of error.

References

Centaurus (constellation)
101947
057175
4511
Centauri, V810
F-type supergiants
B-type giants
Classical Cepheid variables
Semiregular variable stars
Durchmusterung objects
G-type hypergiants